Carlos Enrique Bracho González (born October 6, 1937) is a Mexican actor and writer.

Filmography

Films

Television

References

External links 

1937 births
Living people
20th-century Mexican male actors
Mexican male telenovela actors
Male actors from Aguascalientes
Writers from Aguascalientes
People from Aguascalientes City
21st-century Mexican male actors
Mexican male writers
Mexican male film actors